Wendover railway station serves the town of Wendover in Buckinghamshire, England, and villages including Ellesborough and Wendover Dean. The station is on the London Marylebone – Aylesbury line and is served by Chiltern Railways trains.

History
The station was opened on 1 September 1892 by the Metropolitan Railway (Met), when the railway was extended from Chalfont Road to Aylesbury Town. The Great Central Railway served the station from 1899, linking the station with Leicester, Nottingham, and Sheffield.

When London Underground's Metropolitan line (the successor of the Met) was fully electrified in the late 1950s and early 1960s, a decision was made to run only as far as Amersham. This meant that Wendover was henceforth now only served by main line services;  following the end of steam-hauled Metropolitan line trains in 1961 the service was provided by British Rail Class 115 diesel multiple units until 1992 (which were then replaced by the line's current rolling stock). Responsibility for the station (and the railway north of Amersham to Aylesbury) was transferred from London Transport to British Railways on 11 September 1961; British Railways signage gradually replaced that of the London Underground.

British Rail ran services until privatisation in 1996, when Chiltern Railways took over the franchise.

During the modernisation of the Met in the 1950s, the down (Aylesbury) platform buildings were demolished. In 1989-90 BR's Network SouthEast refurbished the station and the "up" (London) platform canopy was shortened slightly.

During 2013 a new footbridge (with lifts) was constructed (just beyond the London end of the canopy on the Up platform). The old footbridge steps to the platforms were removed, this footbridge still provides a link from outside the station on the Up side to the outside of the station on the Down side.

Services
At peak times there are up to four trains per hour towards London in the morning, and returning from London (towards Aylesbury) in the evening. Some of these are express services, which skip the stops shared with the Metropolitan line nearer to London.

Journeys to Marylebone take about 50 minutes (40 minutes for express trains). Journeys to Aylesbury take about 10 minutes.

The normal off-peak service pattern is as follows:

2 trains per hour to Aylesbury
1 train per hour continues on to Aylesbury Vale Parkway
2 trains per hour to London Marylebone

Onward connections
Very few buses are available from Wendover (the main one being the 50 between Aylesbury and RAF Halton with a minor service 55 operating between Aylesbury and Chesham). The nearest taxi firms are in Aylesbury, except Alexander's Taxis, whose office is about five metres from the entrance to Wendover railway station.

References

External links

 Chiltern Railways
 Photos of Wendover Station

Former Metropolitan and Great Central Joint Railway stations
Metropolitan line stations
Railway stations in Buckinghamshire
Railway stations in Great Britain opened in 1892
Railway stations served by Chiltern Railways
Wendover